Ghafari is a surname. Notable people with the surname include:

Marc Ghafari (born 1991), Lebanese basketball player
Shafiqullah Ghafari (born 2001), Afghan cricketer
Yousif Ghafari (born 1952), American businessman
Zarifa Ghafari, Afghan advocate, activist, politician and entrepreneur

See also 
Ghaffari, is an Iranian family name